Mummu (Cuneiform:  d umum ,  d mu-um-mu) is a Mesopotamian deity. His name is an Akkadian loanword from Sumerian "umun", which translates as "main body, bulk, life-giving force" and "knowledge", as the active part, in contrary to the more lethargic primordial forces of Tiamat and Apsû (Sumerian Abzu).

He appeared in the Babylonian creation myth, the Enuma Elish, as the vizier of the primeval gods Apsû, the fresh water, and Tiamat, the salt water. and sometimes referred to as their son. Towards the middle of Enuma Elish, Ea locks Mummu and Apsu away. 

Mummu is also one of the names given to Marduk, the ultimate victor over Tiamat. Mummu was sometimes also identified with Papsukkal and Ilabrat.

Mummu is a craftsman, the personification of practical knowledge and technical skill. As the third of the primordial gods, Mummu is said to symbolize the mental world, the logos, according to the Neo-Platonist Damascius. Franz Böhl arrived at this association as well, deriving mummu as a participle of the root "to speak" and calling it a precursor of the Hellenistic logos, although Heidel disputed this etymology.

Name
In addition to being the name of the vizier of the primordial gods and an epithet of several major deities (such as Ea, Marduk, Tiamat, and Ishtar), the word "mummu" also has several other definitions. It can be an indefinite pronoun meaning "someone, something"; as well as a noun meaning "craftsman, creator"; "a school for scribes, workshop"; and "a curved stick or beam".

N. K. Sandars' suggests that the meaning of the name could be interpreted as "mist or cloud", and, based on an episode in the Myth of Zu, Sandars argues that the term "mummu" could be understood in terms of the second law of thermodynamics as "entropy", although this reading is idiosyncratic and not supported by other sources, which translate this occurrence as "frame [of the bow]".

Sandars relates:

 "In the battle between them Ningirsu and Zu] an arrow speeding from the bow is ordered to return to its mummu, which means that the shaft becomes again part of the living cane from which it was cut, the gut returns to the animal's rump and the feathers to the bird's winds."

Whereas the Chicago Assyrian Dictionary has:
 "mu-um-mu qashti ana qisatiki (return) frame of the bow, to your forests (beside: arrow to the canebrake, bowstring to the sheep's back, feather to the birds) RA 46 36:42 also ibid. 34:26, dupl. STT 19:79 (Epic of Zu), also RA 46 32:12."

In popular culture
 In Robert Shea and Robert Anton Wilson's Illuminatus! Trilogy, Mummu is the patron of an ancient anarchist faction, the Justified Ancients of Mummu, that first rebels against and later joins the Illuminati. This inspired The KLF, a British 1980s acid house band, to adopt "The Justified Ancients of Mu Mu" as an alias.

References

Mesopotamian gods
Crafts gods
Characters in the Enūma Eliš